St Leonards West Marina is a disused railway station in the West St Leonards area of the borough of Hastings, East Sussex. Opened by the Brighton, Lewes and Hastings Railway in 1846 as part of what became the East Coastway Line, it was the first permanent station to serve the area and became part of a feud between two rival railway companies over access to nearby Hastings. Although ultimately inconvenient for local services, the station became an important goods railhead and the location of a motive power depot for locomotives working express services to London. The station was closed in 1967 and subsequently demolished, although in 2011 remnants of the down platform could still be seen.

History

Opening
Once a bridge over the River Asten had been completed, Bulverhythe was replaced on 7 November 1846 by a permanent station named Hastings & St Leonards which was situated a short distance to the east,  from the centre of St Leonards-on-sea.

LB&SCR and SER feud
The SER took advantage of the government's desire for the line by offering to construct the section between Hastings and Ashford in return for powers to build the North Kent Line, which resulted in the government agreeing to authorise the Hastings-Ashford line provided the SER extended its Tonbridge-Tunbridge Wells line to Hastings. In view of the low revenue earning potential of a Hastings-Ashford line with Rye the largest settlement to be served, the BL&H agreed to transfer ownership of the section to the SER whilst retaining the right to exercise running powers as far as Hastings.

The BL&H had been taken over by the London, Brighton and South Coast Railway (LB&SCR) on 27 July 1846, which decided to exercise the right to run as far as Hastings. A crisis was therefore triggered when the SER's line to Hastings and the short stretch from St Leonards opened simultaneously on 13 February 1851. The SER made it difficult for LB&SCR services to use the new line by holding up a train for so long at Bo-peep junction that it was obliged to return to St Leonards and unload its passengers. Later, the SER tore up track at Bo-Peep and obstructed the line with wagons filled with earth.

LB&SCR services were nevertheless not allowed to call at Warrior Square until December 1870, at which point the LB&SCR changed the name of its own St Leonards station to St Leonards West Marina.

Post-feud to closure
West Marina was inconveniently situated for local traffic but as it was the only station in the area under the LB&SCR's exclusive control, the station was retained and even developed to become a railhead for goods traffic. The LB&SCR tried to improve access in 1882 when a new station was built on an adjacent site to the east. The station was provided with a coal yard with sidings, freight sheds and a  turntable.

The station's stock fell after the 1921 grouping, although it retained a certain importance until the late 1950s as a locomotive depot. Following electrification of the East Coastway line in 1935 by the Southern Railway, the service pattern introduced from May saw express trains from  call at all stations except West Marina. Nevertheless, the station became the terminus for London services in November 1949 when it was necessary to close Bopeep Tunnel for repairs; buses ferried passengers from West Marina to St Leonards Warrior Square. Normal services through the tunnel resumed on 5 June 1950. Remarkably the now dilapidated station remained open to passengers until 10 July 1967, the station's goods yard already having closed on 26 November 1962. For several years after closure the station platforms remained available for use of railway staff requiring access to the depot.

Motive power depot

A motive power depot was established at the station by the LB&SCR in 1846 on the Down side of the line to the west of the Bo-Peep tunnel. The depot served the Hastings area and was a small two-road shed, constructed in brick with a turntable on the northern side. This was replaced by a second larger 4-road shed in 1872, which was enlarged in 1898 and again by British Railways in 1949. In 1926, the shed had 62 staff including 20 drivers and firemen. Following the demolition of the ex-SER shed at Hastings, West Marina shed grew in importance as it took over the former shed's entire allocation in 1929. A new wheel drop facility was fitted in the same year to assist with the increased workload, as were additional carriage sidings. The first of 12 SR V Schools class locomotives arrived in 1931, adding to the shed's 20-odd 4-4-0s, F1s, Ls and a handful of tank and 0-6-0s. The Schools class were used to work Hastings Line expresses to London. As of January 1947, its allocation consisted of 30 locomotives: 20 4-4-0s, 5 0-4-4Ts and 5 0-6-0s.

Following nationalisation, the shed was given the code 74E and it received a new asbestos roof with brick gables. However, by 1957 the depot's role was much reduced as a result of the first stages of dieselisation which had led to the closure of the servicing point at Hastings station and the withdrawal of most of St Leonards' engines. Further dieselisation resulted in the depot's effective closure in June 1958, although engines continued to be serviced and stabled until 10 November 1967. The depot has now been completely demolished. A new diesel depot was opened to the west of the old steam motive power depot.

Present day 
The station buildings were demolished following closure and the site is now the car park of a TK Maxx warehouse store. Where the engine sheds stood, is now a train washing facility which was built in 1958; TK Maxx and a row of houses now stand where the coal yard and freight sheds once stood. The remains of both platforms can also still be seen.

References

Notes

Sources

External links
 St Leonards West Marina station on Subterranea Britannica
 St Leonards West Marina station on navigable 1946 O.S. map
 Images of St Leonards diesel depot

Transport in Hastings
Disused railway stations in East Sussex
Former London, Brighton and South Coast Railway stations
Railway stations in Great Britain opened in 1846
Railway stations in Great Britain closed in 1967